Sri Kodandarama Swami Devastanam is a temple in Buchireddypalem, SPSR Nellore District, Andhra Pradesh, India.

Founding
Construction on the temple began in 1765 by Sri Dodla Rami Reddy, also known as 'Bangaru Rami Reddy', a member of the family which established Buchireddypalem circa 1715–16. Completed in the year 1784, Brahmotsavams have been held every year since, commencing on the Sri Rama Navami day, which falls in the Chaitra month (April–May) of the Hindu calendar.

References

Hindu temples in Nellore district
Vishnu temples
Rama temples
Religious buildings and structures completed in 1784
18th-century Hindu temples